Kenneth Basil Trestrail (26 November 1927 – 24 December 1992) was a West Indian and Canadian cricketer. He was a right-handed batsman and a leg-break bowler.

He played 18 first-class matches for his native Trinidad in the 1940s, earning selection for the West Indian cricket team on their tour to England in 1950. He did not play in any of the Tests on that tour, but played in eighteen of the first-class tour matches, as well as scoring a hundred in each innings against Durham at Ashbrooke in Sunderland. 

He later settled in Canada and returned to England in 1954 with the touring Canadian cricket team, playing four further first-class matches.

He is the great uncle of Trinidadian songwriter Victoria Trestrail.

References
Cricket Archive profile
Cricinfo profile

1927 births
1992 deaths
Canadian cricketers
Trinidad and Tobago cricketers
People from Tunapuna–Piarco
Trinidad and Tobago emigrants to Canada